Matthew Stewart is an American philosopher and author currently living in the Boston, Massachusetts area. He is the author of The 9.9 Percent, Nature's God, The Management Myth, The Courtier and the Heretic, Monturiol's Dream, and The Truth About Everything. He graduated from Princeton University in 1985 with a concentration in political philosophy and was awarded the Sachs Scholarship from Princeton for study at Oxford University, where he earned a D.Phil. in philosophy in 1988. He worked as a management consultant prior to writing full-time.

Bibliography

References

External links 
 mwstewart.com The Official Website of Matthew Stewart
 The Management Myth - The Atlantic, June 2006
 Bogus Theories, Bad for Business - Wall Street Journal book review, August 5, 2009
 "The Epicurean Republic: America's Intellectual Scaffolding - A Conversation with Matthew Stewart", Ideas Roadshow, 2014
 The Business-School Boondoggle - Wall Street Journal book review, April 21, 2017
 The 9.9 Percent Is the New American Aristocracy - The Atlantic, June 2018
Nature's God: The Heretical Origins of the American Republic - The Objective Standard book review, September 20, 2018
 

American philosophers
Living people
1963 births